Saint Mary the Younger (to distinguish her from Saint Mary of Egypt; 875 – 16 February 902) was a Byzantine saint of Armenian origin, the daughter of an Armenian noble. Some details of her life, including her following after the mid-10th century, are not known for certain; the text documenting some of her most noteworthy accomplishments was most likely written after 1025. It has been suggested that the Life of Mary is a parody of Gregory of Nyssa's Life of Macrina.

Life
Her family originated from Greater Armenia, where her father was among the local grandees. They had settled in Constantinople, probably at the start of the reign of Basil I the Macedonian, who called her father along with other Armenian grandees to enter his service. Maria was born in 875, probably in Constantinople, shortly after the death of her father. She had four older siblings, two brothers and two sisters; the latter were already married, indicating that Maria was a late child of her parents. She was raised by her mother, and as soon as she was of age, she married the droungarios Nikephoros, an acquaintance of her brother-in-law Bardas Bratzes. Nikephoros distinguished himself in the 894–896 war against the Bulgarians, and was rewarded with a posting (probably as commander) to the division (tourma) of Bizye.

Around 900 she was accused by the siblings of her husband, Helena and Alexios, of being profligate with money and of a liaison with their servant Demetrios. Mary vehemently denied these allegations, but Nikephoros posted a guard at her room and tortured her maidservant, Agathe, for interrogation. He furthermore removed the supervision of the household finances from Mary and gave it to the steward Drosos and a female servant, with express instructions not to give Mary any money. The latter was so distressed by her husband's treatment of her, that she developed a stomach ailment.

In 902, according to her hagiography, she expressed her disapproval that her husband, along with his siblings and servants, did not observe the fasting of Lent. Her disapproval was transmitted to Nikephoros in much exaggerated form, according to which she claimed that he was no real Christian, but a devil. Enraged, he manhandled Mary, who hit her head trying to escape. She died ten days later, on 16 February. Her funeral was led by the Bishop of Bizye, and was attended by almost the entire population of the town, who accompanied the funeral procession to the local cathedral, where she was buried. In 927, her son Stephen had her corpse, which had been miraculously preserved until that time, removed from her wooden coffin and placed in the marble sarcophagus of his father, whose corpse on the other hand had rotted away and was reburied outside the church.

Attributes
Mary the Younger was a symbol of female virtue. She is described as being merciful, having a pattern of divine love, and having high self-control, which was a stereotypical male quality. She also had duties as a wife and mother, while having a strong sense of loyalty to God. One of Mary the Younger's defining characteristics was that she was highly charitable. She would send money to a tax collector who eased punishment for those imprisoned for not being able to pay the diokete- which was a public tribute tax for housekeeping. In addition, she sought gold to help individuals who were suffering, and protected widows and orphans. From a strictly religious perspective, Mary the Younger was steadfast in her faith to God, even through times of struggle. For example, after her son Orestes died, she praised the Lord in a sincere manner for having let her experience this. From a perspective of gender, the fact that she had a “Married” status was not a significant issue to those who admired her. At the same time, Mary the Younger was looked down upon and underestimated, particularly by males in high places of authority. One of the men who underestimated her was the Bishop of Bizye, who did not believe that a woman who died in a married state could perform miracles the way that a man could.

Commentary
Scholar Linda Hutcheon has proposed that the anonymous Life of Mary is a parody of Gregory of Nyssa's Life of Macrina.

References

Sources 
 

875 births
902 deaths
9th-century Byzantine people
10th-century Byzantine people
10th-century Christian saints
Byzantine female saints
Byzantine people of Armenian descent
Domestic violence
Medieval Thrace
People from Constantinople
Byzantine saints
10th-century Byzantine women
9th-century Byzantine women